Lahraouyine (Berber: ⵍⴰⵀⵔⴰⴻⵢⵏ) is a small city and rural commune in Médiouna Province, of the Casablanca-Settat region of Morocco. It recorded a population of 64,821 in the 2014 Moroccan census. At the time of the 2004 census, the commune had a total population of 52,862 people living in 10,806 households.

References

Populated places in Médiouna Province
Rural communes of Casablanca-Settat